Greene County is a county in the Commonwealth of Pennsylvania. As of the 2020 census, the population was 35,954. Its county seat is Waynesburg. Greene County was created on February 9, 1796, from part of Washington County and named for General Nathanael Greene.

Greene County is part of the Pittsburgh media market. It is in the area of southwestern Pennsylvania that was claimed by Virginia, the District of West Augusta.

Geography
It has a humid continental climate (Dfa/Dfb) and average monthly temperatures in Waynesburg range from 28.9 °F in January to 71.9 °F in July.

Adjacent counties
Washington County (north)
Fayette County (east)
Monongalia County, West Virginia (south)
Wetzel County, West Virginia (southwest)
Marshall County, West Virginia (west)

Demographics

As of the census of 2010, there were 38,686 people, 14,724 households, and 9,970 families residing in the county. The population density was 67 people per square mile (25.9/km2). There were 16,678 housing units at an average density of 29 per square mile (11/km2). The racial makeup of the county was 94.6 percent White, 3.3 percent Black or African American, 0.2% Native American, 0.3 percent Asian, 0.0 percent Pacific Islander, 0.7 percent from other races, and 1.0% from two or more races. 1.2 percent of the population were Hispanic or Latino of any race.

There were 14,724 households, out of which 29.3 percent had children under the age of 18 living with them, 51.5 percent were married couples living together, 10.9 percent had a female householder with no husband present, and 32.3 percent were non-families. 27.0 percent of all households were made up of individuals, and 11.7 percent had someone living alone who was 65 years of age or older.  The average household size was 2.42 and the average family size was 2.91.

In the county, the population was spread out, with 19.9 percent under the age of 18, 9.9 percent from 18 to 24, 25.5 percent from 25 to 44, 29.3 percent from 45 to 64, and 15.3 percent who were 65 years of age or older.  The median age was 41.1 years. For every 100 females there were 106.2 males.  For every 100 females age 18 and over, there were 105.6 males.

2020 Census

Government and politics
Greene County was long a Democratic stronghold, due to the strong unionization of the county's steel mills; between 1932 and 2000, the Democratic presidential candidate won the county in every election except in the Republican landslide of 1972. Due to the decline of the Pittsburgh area's steel industry (similar to other Appalachian counties), and the Democratic Party's shift on cultural issues like the environment and guns, the county has shifted towards the Republican Party, and in 2016 Donald Trump won the county with 68.4% of the vote.

|}

Voter registration
As of November 1, 2021, there are 22,005 registered voters in the county. The number of registered Republicans outnumbers the number of registered Democrats by a margin of 1,052 voters (4.78%); there are 10,462 registered Republicans, 9,410 registered Democrats, 1,433 voters registered non-affiliated voters, and 700 voters registered to other parties.

County Commissioners
Mike Belding, Republican
Betsy McClure, Republican
Blair Zimmerman, Democrat

Other County Officials
President Judge, Hon. Louis Dayich
Associate Judge, Hon. Jeffry N. Grimes
District Attorney, David J. Russo, Republican
Sheriff, Marcus N. Simms, Democrat/Republican
Coroner, Gene Rush, Democrat/Republican
Clerk of Courts, Sherry L. Wise, Democrat/Republican
Prothonotary, Susan Kartley White, Democrat/Republican
Recorder of Deeds and Register of Wills, Donna J. Tharp, Democrat/Republican
Treasurer, Cory L. Grandel, Democrat/Republican
Controller, Ami Cree, Democrat/Republican

State Representative
Donald "Bud" Cook, Democrat, 50th district

State Senator
Camera Bartolotta, Republican, 46th district

US Representative
Guy Reschenthaler, Republican, 14th district

United States Senate 
 John Fetterman, Democrat
 Bob Casey, Jr., Democrat

Economy

Greene County's development commission has assisted area business since 1998.

The Meadow Ridge office park has served the county since the early 2000s.

Two power plant construction projects are underway in Greene County. Hill Top Energy Center, a natural gas-fired power plant with a generating capacity of 625 megawatts, is scheduled to begin operations in the summer of 2021. A new 1,000-megawatt natural gas power plant on the site of the former Hatfield's Ferry power station is scheduled to begin operations in mid-2022.

Education

Colleges and universities
 Waynesburg University

Public school districts
Greene County is divided into five public school districts. There are 15 public schools that serve Greene County, Pennsylvania. 
 Carmichaels Area School District
 Central Greene School District
 Jefferson-Morgan School District
 Southeastern Greene School District
 West Greene School District

Some schools within the five above districts include:
 Greene County Career Technology Center - Waynesburg
 East Franklin School - Waynesburg

Private schools
 Open Door Christian School in Waynesburg (grades K-12) 
 Greene Valley Christian Academy in Rices Landing (grades K-8)

Libraries
 Eva K Bowlby Public Library in Waynesburg
 Flenniken Public Library in Carmichaels, Pennsylvania

Transportation

Interstate Highways

State Highways

Airport
Greene County Airport is a county-owned, public-use airport located two nautical miles (4 km) east of the central business district of Waynesburg, Pennsylvania.

Communities

Under Pennsylvania law, there are four types of incorporated municipalities: cities, boroughs, townships, and, in at most two cases, towns. The following boroughs and townships are located in Greene County:

Boroughs
Carmichaels
Clarksville
Greensboro
Jefferson
Rices Landing
Waynesburg (county seat)

Townships

Aleppo
Center
Cumberland
Dunkard
Franklin
Freeport
Gilmore
Gray
Greene
Jackson
Jefferson
Monongahela
Morgan
Morris
Perry
Richhill
Springhill
Washington
Wayne
Whiteley

Census-designated places
Census-designated places are geographical areas designated by the U.S. Census Bureau for the purposes of compiling demographic data. They are not actual jurisdictions under Pennsylvania law. Other unincorporated communities, such as villages, may be listed here as well.

Bobtown
Brave
Crucible
Dry Tavern
Fairdale
Mapletown
Mather
Morrisville
Mount Morris
Nemacolin
New Freeport
Rogersville
West Waynesburg
Wind Ridge

Population ranking

The population ranking of the following table is based on the 2010 census of Greene County.

† county seat

See also
Greene Connections: Greene County, Pennsylvania Archives Project
National Register of Historic Places listings in Greene County, Pennsylvania

References

Further reading
 Martines, Jamie. A Pennsylvania county went from bust to boom times with natural gas. Now, it’s nearly broke. Spotlight PA. March 8, 2021
  White-Nockleby, Caroline; Wahid, Mimi; Boone, Caroline; Delhees, Benjamin. Changes in the contribution of coal to tax revenues in Greene County, PA, 2010-2019 Massachusetts Institute of Technology Environmental Solutions Initiative. March 2021.
 Ohio River Valley Institute. Appalachia's Natural Gas Counties: Contributing more to the U.S. economy and getting less in return. The Natural Gas Fracking Boom and Appalachia's Lost Economic Decade February 12, 2021.

External links
 

 
1796 establishments in Pennsylvania
Populated places established in 1796
Counties of Appalachia